The String Quartet No. 5 (D 68) in B-flat major was composed by Franz Schubert in 1813.

Movements
 Allegro (B-flat major)
 Allegro (B-flat major)

The middle movements have been lost.

Sources
 
 Franz Schubert's Works, Series V: Streichquartette edited by Joseph Hellmesberger and Eusebius Mandyczewski. Breitkopf & Härtel, 1890
 Otto Erich Deutsch (and others). Schubert Thematic Catalogue (several editions), No. 68.
 New Schubert Edition, Series VI, Volume 3: Streichquartette I edited by Martin Chusid. Bärenreiter, 1979.

External links 
 

String Quartet No. 05
1813 compositions